Freddie Lee Glenn (born January 6, 1957) was an American spree killer and rapist. Along with his accomplice, Michael Corbett, Glenn was found guilty of murdering three people in 1975. Glenn and Corbett were responsible for up to five deaths in and around Colorado Springs, Colorado. Glenn's most notable victim of the crime was Karen Grammer, the younger sister of actor Kelsey Grammer.

Early life 
Glenn was born in St. Petersburg, Florida, and was of African descent, his father was in the military, and the family lived in Fort Lewis in Washington. Glenn claimed that his father was abusive.

Murders 
The murders started on June 19, 1975, when Glenn, a civilian employee at Fort Carson, Corbett, a soldier, and another soldier kidnapped Daniel Van Lone, a 29-year-old cook who was leaving his job at the Four Seasons hotel, intending to rob him. They drove Van Lone to a remote area, made him lie on the ground, and shot him in the head. They stole 50 cents from him. Eight days later, Glenn and Corbett met Winfred Proffitt, 19, another Fort Carson soldier, at Prospect Lake, intending to sell him some marijuana. Having been trained in the use of bayonets, Corbett stabbed Proffitt with one of them to see what it was like.

Glenn and Corbett committed their final and most publicized murder on July 1, 1975. Glenn, Corbett, and two other men decided to rob the Red Lobster restaurant on South Academy Boulevard. They left without any money. An employee of the restaurant, 18 year-old Karen Grammer, was waiting for her boyfriend to finish work. Thinking she may be able to identify them, the four men kidnapped her. After robbing a convenience store, the men took Grammer to the apartment they shared, where they raped her repeatedly. They promised to take Grammer home, then sat her in the car, put a cloth over her head and let her out in a mobile home park on South Wahsatch Avenue. Glenn, who according to court testimony had taken LSD, stabbed Grammer in the throat, back and hand, and left her to die. In an attempt to save herself, she ran toward the back porch of a nearby home where there was a light on; however the homeowners were out. She died at the property leaving bloody hand and fingerprints where she tried to reach the doorbell. Police photographs show a bloody hand print on the wall, near the doorbell. Police were unable to determine who she was until her roommate at the time called to report her missing and subsequently identified her.

Trial and conviction 
Glenn was convicted in 1976 for the murders of Van Lone, Profitt, and Karen Grammer. Judge Hunter Hardeman, noting "there was no rhyme or reason for what happened," sentenced Glenn to the gas chamber for Karen Grammer's murder. Two years later, the Colorado Supreme Court overturned the state's death penalty. When Glenn was sentenced, the law allowed parole after he served 10 years. Because he was sentenced to three consecutive life terms, he became eligible for parole in 2006. Corbett remained in prison until his death in 2019.

Parole denial 
In 2009, Glenn was denied parole once after the Colorado Parole Board received a letter from actor Kelsey Grammer, who described Glenn as a "butcher" and a "monster". The Board also heard from other relatives of the victims and from detectives before deciding not to release Glenn from prison. Grammer had originally planned to attend the hearing at the state's Limon Correctional Facility, but a rain delay at New York City's JFK International Airport caused him to miss a connecting flight to Denver. Instead, Grammer sent a letter to Robert Russel, the retired El Paso County, Colorado, District Attorney who successfully prosecuted Glenn. During the hearing, Glenn told the board: "I apologize for my participation in something so terrible. I am sincerely and truly remorseful." 

According to his letter to Russel, Grammer described about his sister, who had graduated from high school and decided to take a year off after she attended a semester of college. He also indicated that his sister was said to have moved to Colorado Springs because of a boy that she liked. Grammer wrote: "She was so smart and good and decent. She wrote poetry and loved being alive; we could laugh for hours together ... I was supposed to protect her—I could not. I have never gotten over it. I was supposed to save her. I could not. It very nearly destroyed me ... When we heard this man might be paroled, the suffering began anew".

Glenn was eligible for parole in 2014, but was denied twice and his request was deferred for three years. At the parole board hearing, Kelsey Grammer gave an emotional testimony via video conference, where he offered forgiveness after being convinced that Glenn was remorseful for killing his sister. However, Grammer has said that Glenn should stay behind bars and serve out the remainder of his life sentence. In 2017, Grammer repeated his position when Glenn became eligible for parole again, in which he stated that Glenn would not deserve freedom in the future.

References 

1957 births
African-American people
American people convicted of murder
American prisoners sentenced to death
American rapists
American spree killers
People convicted of murder by Colorado
Prisoners sentenced to death by Colorado
Living people
20th-century American criminals
Criminals from Colorado
20th-century African-American people
People from St. Petersburg, Florida